Lianhua West station is a metro station on Line 2 of the Shenzhen Metro. It is located under Xinzhou Road and Hongli West Road.

Station layout

Exits

References

External links
 Shenzhen Metro Lianhua West Station (Chinese)
 Shenzhen Metro Lianhua West Station (English)

Shenzhen Metro stations
Railway stations in Guangdong
Futian District
Railway stations in China opened in 2011